Tai Anthony Tuivasa (born 16 March 1993) is an Australian professional mixed martial artist. He currently competes in the Heavyweight division in the Ultimate Fighting Championship (UFC). As of March 13, 2023, he is #6 in the UFC heavyweight rankings.

Early life
Tuivasa was born in Sydney to an Indigenous Australian (Wiradjuri) mother and a Samoan father. He grew up in the western Sydney suburb of Mount Druitt with 11 siblings, and predominantly played rugby league in his youth. He was signed by the professional Sydney Roosters rugby league club in 2010 but gave up playing the sport when he developed a gambling addiction.

Mixed martial arts career

Early career
Tuivasa made his professional MMA debut in August 2012 in his native Australia. He fought sporadically over the next four years, with all of his wins ending in knockouts.

Tuivasa also fought a couple MMA mixed rules bouts with Combat 8 promotions. Tuivasa fought Australian former rugby league representative John Hopoate on 1 December 2012 in the Newcastle Panthers FC arena at Combat 8:02, the second Combat 8 event, winning the fight by TKO. Tuivasa later fought kickboxer Peter Graham at Combat 8:03, in a back and forth brawl that seemed as if Tuivasa would finish his opponent early on. Yet as the fight went on, Graham rallied and Tuivasa tired, leading to an eventual loss for Tuivasa via TKO in the second round due to punches.

Ultimate Fighting Championship
In November 2016, it was announced that Tuivasa had signed a four-fight contract with the Ultimate Fighting Championship. According to Tuivasa, he had to sit out for an extended period due to a knee injury and subsequent surgery.

Tuivasa would make his UFC debut against Rashad Coulter on 19 November 2017 at UFC Fight Night: Werdum vs. Tybura. Tuivasa won the fight via knockout due to a flying knee in the first round and became the first indigenous Australian to win a UFC fight. This win also earned him the Performance of the Night bonus.

Tuivasa faced Cyril Asker on 11 February 2018 at UFC 221. He won the fight via technical knock out in the first round. On 13 February 2018 Tuivasa entered the UFC's official rankings for heavyweight fighters, coming in at position 15.

In March 2018, Tuivasa signed a new, four-fight contract with UFC. Tuivasa faced Andrei Arlovski on 9 June 2018 at UFC 225. He won the fight by unanimous decision.

Tuivasa faced former UFC Heavyweight Champion Junior dos Santos on 2 December 2018 at UFC Fight Night 142.  He lost the fight via technical knockout in round two.

Tuivasa faced Blagoy Ivanov on 8 June 2019 at UFC 238. He lost the fight via unanimous decision.

Tuivasa faced Sergey Spivak on 6 October 2019 at UFC 243. He lost the fight via arm-triangle choke in the second round.

Tuivasa was scheduled to face Jarjis Danho on 6 June 2020 at UFC 251. However, on 9 April, Dana White, the president of UFC announced that this event was postponed to a future date.

Tuivasa faced Stefan Struve on 24 October 2020 at UFC 254. He won the fight via knockout in the first round.

Tuivasa was scheduled to face Don'Tale Mayes on 20 March 2021 at UFC on ESPN 21. However, Mayes was removed from the fight during the week leading up to the event for undisclosed reasons and was replaced by promotional newcomer Harry Hunsucker. Tuivasa won the fight via technical knockout in round one.

Tuivasa faced Greg Hardy on 10 July 2021 at UFC 264. He won the fight via knockout in round one. This win earned him the Performance of the Night award.

Tuivasa was scheduled to face Walt Harris on 30 October 2021 at UFC 267. However, Harris pulled out of the bout and Tuivasa was scheduled to face Augusto Sakai on 20 November 2021 at UFC Fight Night 198. However due to visa issues for Tuivasa, the bout was scrapped. The pair was rescheduled and eventually met on 11 December 2021 at UFC 269. Tuivasa won the fight via knockout in the second round. The win also earned Tuivasa his third Performance of the Night bonus award.

Tuivasa faced Derrick Lewis on 12 February 2022 at UFC 271. Tuivasa won the fight via knockout in round two. The win earned him a Performance of the Night bonus award.

Tuivasa faced Ciryl Gane on 3 September 2022 at UFC Fight Night 209. Despite a knockdown for Tuivasa in the second, he lost the fight via knockout in round three. This fight earned him the Fight of the Night award.

Tuivasa faced Sergei Pavlovich on  December 3, 2022, at UFC on ESPN 42. He lost the fight via knockout in round one.

Championships and accomplishments
Ultimate Fighting Championship
Performance of the Night (four times) 
Fight of the Night (one time) 
Australian Fighting Championship
AFC Heavyweight Champion (one time)
National Dreamtime Awards 2018
National Dreamtime Awards 2018 International Sportsperson of the Year.
MMAjunkie.com
2021 July Knockout of the Month

Personal life
Tuivasa has one son, Carter Tuivasa, with Brierley Pedro who is the sister of UFC light heavyweight fighter Tyson Pedro.

Tuivasa currently hosts "The Halfcast Podcast" with Tyson Pedro and Andrew Fifita as co-hosts.

Since 2018, Tuivasa has celebrated his victories by doing a shoey, drinking beer from a borrowed shoe. Sydney newspaper The Daily Telegraph coined the moniker "Shoeyvasa". At UFC 254, he won again but was not allowed to do the shoey in the cage, but has since continued the tradition.

Mixed martial arts record 

|-
|-
|Loss
|align=center|14–5
|Sergei Pavlovich
|KO (punches)
|UFC on ESPN: Thompson vs. Holland
|
|align=center|1
|align=center|0:54
|Orlando, Florida, United States
|
|-
|Loss
|align=center|14–4
|Ciryl Gane
|KO (punches)
|UFC Fight Night: Gane vs. Tuivasa
|
|align=center|3
|align=center|4:23
|Paris, France
|
|-
|Win
|align=center|14–3
|Derrick Lewis
|KO (elbow)
|UFC 271
|
|align=center|2
|align=center|1:40
|Houston, Texas, United States
|
|-
|Win
|align=center|13–3
|Augusto Sakai
|KO (punches)
|UFC 269
|
|align=center|2
|align=center|0:26
|Las Vegas, Nevada, United States
|
|-
|Win
|align=center|12–3
|Greg Hardy
|KO (punches)
|UFC 264
|
|align=center|1
|align=center|1:07
|Las Vegas, Nevada, United States
|
|-
|Win
|align=center|11–3
|Harry Hunsucker
|TKO (punches)
|UFC on ESPN: Brunson vs. Holland
|
|align=center|1
|align=center|0:49
|Las Vegas, Nevada, United States
|
|-
|Win
|align=center|10–3
|Stefan Struve
|KO (punches)
|UFC 254 
|
|align=center|1
|align=center|4:59
|Abu Dhabi, United Arab Emirates
|  
|--> 
|-
|Loss
|align=center|9–3
|Sergey Spivak 
|Technical Submission (arm-triangle choke)
|UFC 243 
|
|align=center|2
|align=center|3:14
|Melbourne, Australia
|
|-
|Loss
|align=center|9–2
|Blagoy Ivanov
|Decision (unanimous)
|UFC 238 
|
|align=center|3
|align=center|5:00
|Chicago, Illinois, United States
|
|-
|Loss
|align=center|9–1
|Junior dos Santos
|TKO (punches)
|UFC Fight Night: dos Santos vs. Tuivasa 
|
|align=center|2
|align=center|2:30
|Adelaide, Australia
|
|-
|Win
|align=center|9–0
|Andrei Arlovski
|Decision (unanimous)
|UFC 225 
|
|align=center|3
|align=center|5:00
|Chicago, Illinois, United States
|
|-
|Win
|align=center|8–0
|Cyril Asker
|TKO (punches and elbows)
|UFC 221 
|
|align=center|1
|align=center|2:18
|Perth, Australia
|
|-
|Win
|align=center|7–0
|Rashad Coulter
|KO (flying knee)
|UFC Fight Night: Werdum vs. Tybura
|
|align=center|1
|align=center|4:35
|Sydney, Australia
|
|-
| Win
|align=center|6–0
|James McSweeney
|TKO (corner stoppage)
|AFC 17
|
|align=center|1
|align=center|5:00
|Melbourne, Australia
|
|-
|Win
|align=center|5–0
|Brandon Sololi
|KO (elbow)
|AFC 16
|
|align=center|1
|align=center|0:21
|Melbourne, Australia
|
|-
|Win
|align=center|4–0
|Gul Pohatu
|TKO (punches)
|Urban Fight Night 5
|
|align=center|1
|align=center|0:44
|Liverpool, Australia
|
|-
|Win
|align=center|3–0
|Erik Nosa
|TKO (punches)
|Gladiators Cage Fighting: Gladiators 3
|
|align=center|1
|align=center|0:28
|Sydney, Australia
|
|-
|Win
|align=center|2–0
|Aaron Nieborak
|TKO (punches)
|Gladiators Cage Fighting: Gladiators 2
|
|align=center|1
|align=center|N/A
|Sydney, Australia
|
|-
|Win
|align=center|1–0
|Simon Osborne
|TKO (punches)
|Elite Cage Championships 2
|
|align=center|1
|align=center|N/A
|Sydney, Australia
|
|-

Professional boxing record

Kickboxing record 

|- 
|-  style="background:#FFBBBB
| 16 October 2014 || Loss ||align=left| Ismael Lazaar ||GFC Heavyweight Tournament, Semi Finals || Dubai, UAE || TKO (punches and knees) || 2 ||1:32 
|- 
|- 
|-
| colspan=9 | Legend:

MMA mixed rules record

|-
|Loss
|align=center|1–1
|Peter Graham 
|TKO (punches)
|Combat8:03
|
|align=center|2
|align=center|2:55
|Big Top Sydney, Newcastle, Australia
|
|-
|Win
|align=center|1–0
|John Hopoate
|TKO (punches)
|Combat8:02
|
|align=center|1
|align=center|1:40
|Wests City, Newcastle, Australia
|
|-

See also
List of current UFC fighters
List of male mixed martial artists

Notes

References

External links
 

1993 births
Living people
Australian people of Indigenous Australian descent
Australian sportspeople of Samoan descent
Sportsmen from New South Wales
Australian male mixed martial artists
Heavyweight mixed martial artists
Mixed martial artists utilizing boxing
Mixed martial artists utilizing kickboxing
Australian male kickboxers
Australian podcasters
Kickboxers from Sydney
Ultimate Fighting Championship male fighters
Mixed martial artists utilizing Muay Thai